Fairview Park is a north-eastern suburb of Adelaide, South Australia within the City of Tea Tree Gully. It is at the base of the Adelaide Hills.

Attractions
 

The suburb contains a golf course on its southern boundary. 
 
There are also commercial interests in the suburb, including a hotel, supermarket and range of businesses along Hancock Road.

Transport
The following bus routes in Adelaide travel to Fairview Park through the O-Bahn Busway: 541, 541G, 542, 542X and the J3.

References 

Suburbs of Adelaide